De Cristoforis is an Italian surname. Notable people with the name include:

 Giuseppe De Cristoforis, Italian naturalist and collector
 Tommaso De Cristoforis, Italian Lieutenant Colonel

See also 

 Cristofori (surname) 

Italian-language surnames